is a Japanese rugby union player. He was named in Japan's squad for the 2015 Rugby World Cup.

References

1988 births
Living people
Tokai University alumni
Japanese rugby union players
Japan international rugby union players
People from Higashiōsaka
Rugby union hookers
Kobelco Kobe Steelers players
Sunwolves players
Sportspeople from Osaka Prefecture
Hino Red Dolphins players